Moving Careful is an EP by Canadian singer-songwriter Hayden.  It was released in Canada on Sonic Unyon/Hardwood Records and later issued on 10" vinyl through Hardwood Records.

Track listing 
All songs written by Paul Hayden Desser.

 "Pots and Pans" – 2:34
 "Stride" – 2:47
 "Middle of July" – 2:26
 "Old Fashioned Way" – 2:35
 "Half for Me" – 3:24
 "Choking" – 2:36
 "You Are All I Have" – 57:48
 The song "You Are All I Have" is long 6:04. The hidden track "Winter Trip" begins at 8:44, after 2 minutes and 40 seconds of silence. The hidden track ends at minute 12:45 and begins a looped recording of the rain for 45 minutes

Notes 

Hayden (musician) albums
1996 EPs
Sonic Unyon Records EPs